Arthur Mitchell Wrubel is an American private equity investor who founded Wesley Capital Management, LLC and is a minority owner of the Philadelphia 76ers of the National Basketball Association.

Early life and education
Wrubel was born to a Jewish family, the son of Marcia Kay (née Pinkus) and Richard Isaac Wrubel. His family operated the Wrubels department store in Middletown, Connecticut, founded by his great-grandparents, Regina (nee Glasscheib) and Isaac Wrubel. His great-uncle was composer and songwriter Allie Wrubel. In 1983, Wrubel graduated from Xavier High School in Middletown and in 1987, he graduated with a B.S. in Economics from the Wharton School at the University of Pennsylvania where he was a member of the Sigma Alpha Mu fraternity.

Career 
After school, he worked for Chicago-based JMB Realty as an associate in their acquisition group. In 1993, he took a job with Dickstein & Co. where he focused in real estate, asset backed securities, and real estate corporate restructurings and was involved in some of the largest real estate restructurings including those of including Olympia & York, Cadillac Fairview, Rockefeller Center Properties, Bramalea, and Trizec Properties. In 2001, he ventured out on his own and founded Wesley Capital Management, LLC, a real estate focused hedge fund. 
Wrubel is a member of an investment group that won a $280 million bid for the purchase of the Philadelphia 76ers from Comcast Spectacor in 2011. The other members of the investment group are: Joshua Harris, managing partner of the group and co-founder of private equity firm Apollo Global Management and David S. Blitzer of the private equity firm Blackstone Group, both fellow Wharton School of the University of Pennsylvania graduates, as well as former NBA agent and Sacramento Kings executive Jason Levien, former Vail Resorts CEO Adam Aron, Martin J. Geller, David B. Heller, Travis Hennings, James Lassiter, Marc Leder, Michael Rubin, Will Smith & Jada Pinkett Smith, and Indonesian businessmen Handy Soetedjo & Erick Thohir. Comcast-Spectacor and Harris began talks in the summer of 2011. The deal was announced on July 13, 2011.  The NBA formally approved the deal on October 13.

Additional affiliations and memberships 
Wrubel is a member of the Board of Advisors at Mount Sinai Hospital’s, on the Board of Trustees at the Jewish Museum in Manhattan, and is on the Wharton Undergraduate Board at the University of Pennsylvania. Wrubel is also on the Advisory Board of Maxim Capital Group. He and his wife are strong supporters of the Jonah Maccabee Foundation, which provides grants to organizations that provide charity, promote music, or support Jewish causes.

Personal life
He is married to Melanie Bloom.

References

1965 births
Businesspeople from New York City
American financiers
Philadelphia 76ers owners
Wharton School of the University of Pennsylvania alumni
Jewish American sportspeople
Living people
21st-century American Jews